Gbongaha is a town in north-western Ivory Coast. It is a sub-prefecture of Séguélon Department in Kabadougou Region, Denguélé District.

Gbongaha was a commune until March 2012, when it became one of 1,126 communes nationwide that were abolished.

In 2014, the population of the sub-prefecture of Gbongaha was 10,407.

Villages
The 6 villages of the sub-prefecture of Gbongaha and their populations in 2014 are:
 Gbongaha  (3,934)
 Karabiri  (2,414)
 Ouanégué  (1,067)
 Siréba  (1,108)
 Sirédéni 1  (1,051)
 Sirédéni 2  (833)

References

Sub-prefectures of Kabadougou
Former communes of Ivory Coast